Yu Lik-wai (born 12 August 1966), sometimes credited as Nelson Yu, is a Hong Kong cinematographer, film director, and occasional film producer. Born in Hong Kong, Yu Lik-wai was educated at Belgium's INSAS (Institut National Superieur des Arts de Spectacle) where he graduated with a degree in cinematography in 1994. Yu has become a mainstay in both the cinemas of China (where he is perhaps best known for his collaborations with director Jia Zhangke) and Hong Kong.

Yu has served as director of photography for nearly all of Chinese director Jia Zhangke's films, and along with Jia, founded their own independent film production company, Xstream Pictures.

He has been announced as a member of the jury for the Cinéfoundation and Short Films sections of the 2012 Cannes Film Festival.

Filmography

As cinematographer

As director

References

External links
 
 
 Yu Lik-wai at the Chinese Movie Database

1966 births
Living people
Chinese cinematographers
Chinese film producers
Hong Kong cinematographers
Hong Kong film directors
Hong Kong film producers
Hong Kong artists